The Germany men's national under-16 and under-17 basketball team is for men basketball sides that represents Germany in international under-16 and under-17 (under age 16 and under age 17) competitions. It is organized and run by the German Basketball Federation (Deutscher Basketball Bund).

Former members include Lukas Herzog and Ariel Hukporti who were both part of the Porsche Basketball Academy, the youth division of Riesen Ludwigsburg.

See also
 Germany national basketball team
 Germany national under-19 basketball team

References

External links
Official website 
FIBA profile

Men's national under-17 basketball teams
Basketball